Háje nad Jizerou is a municipality and village in Semily District in the Liberec Region of the Czech Republic. It has about 700 inhabitants.

Administrative parts
Villages of Dolní Sytová, Loukov and Rybnice are administrative parts of Háje nad Jizerou.

References

Villages in Semily District